The men's long jump event at the 1954 British Empire and Commonwealth Games was held on 6 July at the Empire Stadium in Vancouver, Canada.

Results

References

Athletics at the 1954 British Empire and Commonwealth Games
1954